Jagadguru Sri Shankara Vijayendra Saraswathi Swamigal (born 13 March 1969) is the 70th Jagadguru Peethadipathi of Kanchi Kamakoti Peetham, Kanchipuram. He became the senior Pontiff of the Kanchi Mutt following the attainment of Vidhehamukthi of Jayendra Saraswati, the 69th Pontiff, on 28 February 2018.

Biography 
Sri Shankara Vijayendra Saraswathi was born in 1969 as Sankara Narayanan in Periyapalayam village near Arani in Tiruvallur. He attended a village school in Periyapalayam and studied the Vedas with his father, Sri Krishnamurthy Sastri, a Vedic scholar and teacher. He joined the Kanchi Kamakoti Peetham when he was 13 and was named 70th Peetadipati in 1983. Sri Shankara Vijayendra Sarasvati Swamigal has toured many parts of the country. He has visited places like Punjab, Himachal Pradesh, Assam, Orissa, West Bengal, and all other parts of southern India. He also visited Nepal in the year 1998 with His Guru Sri Jayendra Saraswati Swamigal.

Arrest and Acquittal

In 2004, the junior Sri Vijayendra Saraswathi Mahaswamigal was arrested in connection with the Sankararaman murder case on Diwali day along with the senior Jayendra Saraswathi pontiff. The court said that the complainant failed to support the prosecution and he was given bail. The trial went on till 2013 when he was acquitted by the court.

Controversy
Vijayendra Saraswati chose to sit through the Tamil Thai Vazhthu even as he reportedly stood for the national anthem at during the release of a Tamil-Sanskrit dictionary compiled by late father of Bharatiya Janata Party leader H Raja in January 2018.Tamils from across the world criticized him for insulting the Tamil anthem. In a clarification, the Kanchi Mutt has said that Vijayendra Saraswati was meditating when the anthem was playing. Hundreds of activists belonging to Dravidar Viduthalai Kazhagam and Viduthalai Chiruthaigal Katchi were arrested by the police when they tried to besiege the Mutt fortified with heavy police security. Several Tamil organisations filed complaints against him. The Madras high court on March directed the police to register an FIR after a complaint filed by Thanthai Periyar Dravidar Kazhagam. Justice G.R. Swaminathan quashed an FIR in December 2021 filed by Naam Tamilar Katchi saying the ‘Tamil Thai Vazhthu’ is only a prayer song and not a National Anthem and hence, there is no need for every one to remain in standing posture when it is rendered.

References

External links
Shri Kanchi Kamakoti Peetham

21st-century Hindu religious leaders
1969 births
Indian Hindu monks
Living people
Shankaracharyas